Gennadiy Vladimirovich Markov (born 15 June 1967 in Izobilny, Soviet Union) is a Russian triple jumper. His personal best jump is 17.38 metres, achieved in May 1994 in Stavropol.

He competed at the 1997 World Indoor Championships and the 2000 Olympic Games without reaching the final.

Achievements

References

External links 

1967 births
Living people
Russian male triple jumpers
Athletes (track and field) at the 2000 Summer Olympics
Olympic athletes of Russia
People from Izobilnensky District
Sportspeople from Stavropol Krai
Competitors at the 1994 Goodwill Games